A delivery drone is an unmanned aerial vehicle (UAV) used to transport packages that include medical supplies, food, or other goods. Given their life-saving potential, use cases for medical supplies in particular have become the most widely-tested type of drone delivery, with trials and pilot projects in dozens of countries such as Australia, Canada, Botswana, Ghana, Uganda, the UK, the US among others (see below).  Delivery drones are typically autonomous and electric, sometimes also operated as a part of a fleet.

Since 2018, the German consulting firm Drone Industry Insights provides a yearly ranking of drone delivery service providers which is widely referenced throughout the drone industry. Drones are nowadays also being used to ferry/delivery of personnel in form of Air Taxis. Presently, countries are in trial phase of use of Drones as Air Taxies. Dubai & India are presently carrying out trials of Drones as Air Taxies.

Applications

Healthcare delivery

Drones can be used to transport medicinal products such as blood products, vaccines, pharmaceuticals, and medical samples. Medical deliveries are able to fly into and out of remote or otherwise inaccessible regions, compared to trucks or motorcycles. Medical drone delivery is credited with saving lives during emergency deliveries of blood in Rwanda and post-hurricane relief in Puerto Rico.

During the COVID-19 pandemic, drones made medical deliveries of personal protective equipment and COVID-19 tests in the United States, Israel, and Ghana. In partnership with the Ghana Ministry of Health, Zipline drones delivered thousands of COVID-19 vaccine vials in Ghana during 2020 and 2021.University of British Columbia (UBC) has. selected Drone Delivery Canada Corp for UBC's “Remote Communities Drone Transport Initiative” program. This solution will be used to transport a variety of cargo for the benefit of the Stellat’en First Nation, located in the Fraser Lake area of Central Northern British Columbia.

Irish drone-delivery startup Manna was ready to start deliveries as the COVID-19 pandemic started in March of 2020. The company quickly restructured to start making essential deliveries of prescription medication and food to isolated residents in the village of Moneygall, Barack Obama's ancestral home. Ireland's national health service, the HSE, designated Manna an essential service and it took the company a week to pivot from the original plan of food delivery to delivering essential medical goods.

In August 2022, St Mary's Hospital on the Isle of Wight was selected to participate in a pilot scheme for receiving medicine delivered by delivery drones, with the shipments being flown in from the Portsmouth Hospitals University NHS Trust's pharmacy on the mainland.

Food delivery

Drones have been proposed as a solution for rapidly delivering prepared foods, such as pizzas, tacos, and frozen beverages.

Foodpanda has piloted food deliveries in Singapore using multirotor drones from ST Engineering and in Pakistan using VTOL drones from Woot Tech. 
Early prototypes of food delivery drones include the Tacocopter demonstration by Star Simpson, which was a taco delivery concept utilizing a smartphone app to order drone-delivered tacos in San Francisco area. The revelation that it didn't exist as a delivery system or app led to it being labelled a hoax. A similar concept named the "burrito bomber" was tested in 2012.

Manna drone delivery has been successfully delivering orders by drone from Tesco, local coffee and bookshops, takeaways via Just Eat in the town of Oranmore in County Galway since October, and has proved so popular that 35 per cent of the 3,000 or so homes in its delivery area have tried the service.

Postal delivery
Different postal companies from Australia, Switzerland, Germany, Singapore, the United Kingdom and Ukraine have undertaken various drone trials as they test the feasibility and profitability of unmanned delivery drone services. The USPS has been testing delivery systems with HorseFly Drones.

Ship resupply

The shipping line Maersk and the Port of Rotterdam have experimented with using drones to resupply offshore ships instead of sending smaller boats.

Regulation

In February 2014, the prime minister and cabinet affairs minister of the United Arab Emirates (UAE) announced that the UAE planned to launch a fleet of UAVs for civilian purposes. Plans were for the UAVs to use fingerprint and eye-recognition systems to deliver official documents such as passports, ID cards and licenses, and supply emergency services at accidents. A battery-powered prototype four-rotor UAV about half a meter across was displayed in Dubai.

In the United States, initial attempts at commercial use of UAVs were blocked by FAA regulation, but were later allowed. In June 2014, the FAA published a document that listed activities not permitted under its regulations, including commercial use, which the organization stated included "delivering packages to people for a fee" or offered as part of a "purchase or another offer." The agency issued waivers to many organizations for less restrictive commercial uses, but each had to apply individually. In August 2016, the FAA adopted Part 107 rules that allowed limited commercial use by right. Drone operation under these rules is restricted to line-of-sight of the pilot and is not allowed over people, implying many applications like delivery to populated areas still requires a waiver. In 2019, the FAA began certifying drone delivery companies under conventional charter airline Part 135 rules, with some accommodations for drones (such as that the pilot manual did not need to be carried on board). In preparation for higher volumes of drone traffic, the FAA finalized the Remote ID regulation in December 2020, giving manufacturers 18 months and operators 30 months to comply with the requirement for self-identification transmissions outside of designated areas. At the same time, the FAA added a Operations Over People and at Night rule to Part 107. Nighttime operations require anti-collision lights and additional pilot training. For flight over people or moving vehicles, drones are put into four categories depending on capability of injury to people, with the least restricted category having a full Part 21 airworthiness certificate.

Early experiments
The concept of drone delivery entered the mainstream with Amazon Prime Air – Amazon.com founder Jeff Bezos' December 2013 announcement that Amazon was planning rapid delivery of lightweight commercial products using UAVs. Amazon's press release was met with skepticism, with perceived hurdles including federal and state regulatory approval, public safety, reliability, individual privacy, operator training and certification, security (hacking), payload thievery, and logistical challenges.

In December 2013, in a research project of Deutsche Post AG subsidiary DHL, a sub-kilogram quantity of medicine was delivered via a prototype Microdrones "Parcelcopter", raising speculation that disaster relief may be the first industry the company will use the technology.

In August 2014, Google revealed it had been testing UAVs in Australia for two years. The Google X program known as "Project Wing" announced an aim to produce drones that can deliver products sold via e-commerce.

In February 2015, Hangzhou-based e-commerce provider Ali Baba started delivery drone service in a partnership with Shanghai YTO Express in which it delivered tea to 450 customers around select cities in China.

In 2015, an Israeli startup Flytrex partnered with AHA, Iceland's largest eCommerce website, and together they initiated a drone delivery route which demonstrated reducing delivery time from 30 minutes, to less than 5 minutes.

In March 2016, Flirtey conducted the first fully autonomous FAA approved drone delivery in an urban setting in the U.S.

A partnership between 7-Eleven and Flirtey resulted in the first FAA-approved delivery to a residence in the United States in July 2016, delivering a frozen Slurpee. The following month, the company partnered with Domino's in New Zealand to launch the first commercial drone delivery service.

In China, JD.com has been developing drone delivery capabilities. The drones are capable of delivering packages weighing between 5 and 30 kg (11 to 66 lbs) while flying up to 100 km/hr (62 mph). The drones fly along fixed routes from warehouses to special landing pads where one of JD.com's 300,000 local contractors then delivers the packages to the customers’ doorsteps in the rural villages. The e-commerce giant is also working on a 1 metric ton (1,000 kg) delivery drone which will be tested in Shaanxi.

In January 2018, Boeing unveiled a prototype of a cargo drone for up to 500 lb (227 kg) payloads, an electric flying testbed that completed flight tests at the Boeing Research & Technology research center in Missouri.

Commercial systems

Zipline
In 2016, Zipline began their partnership with the government of Rwanda to construct and operate a medical distribution center in Muhanga. Rwanda has a mountainous geography, poor road conditions, and a long rainy season, making an aerial delivery system more cost efficient and timely than traditional road-based deliveries. As of May 2018, they had delivered over 7,000 units of blood using drones. By October 2020, Zipline had made over 70,000 medical deliveries by drone and expanded operations across Rwanda and Ghana.

Their drones are small fixed-wing electric airplanes, enabling them to fly fast and over long distances (up to 180 km round-trip on a single charge), in all weather seen in Rwanda. Zipline drones use an assisted take-off to enter flight, and for landing they use an arresting gear-inspired mechatronic recovery system.

During a delivery, the Zipline drone does not land, but instead descends to a low height and drops the package to the ground, slowed by a parachute-like air brake.

In 2020, Zipline began deliveries between Novant Health facilities in Kannapolis and Huntersville, North Carolina.

Wing

The company Wing incubated by Google X began commercial deliveries in Christiansburg, Virginia in October, 2019. It carries parcels up to three pounds, using a tether for the final drop. As of April 2020, shippers were limited to FedEx, Walgreens, Sugar Magnolia, Mockingbird Café, and Brugh Coffee. Wing had obtained an FAA Part 135 air carrier certificate in April, 2019, which allowed it to charge to carry third-party cargo, and to operate out of the line of sight of the pilot. It also delivered over a thousand meals to Virginia Tech students and employees in a fall 2016 test program.

Wing also operates in Canberra, Logan, Queensland, and Helsinki.

Wing announced it had conducted around 100,000 drone deliveries in August 2021, since launching trial services in September 2019. Wing uses two aircraft designs. The first features 12 hover motors and two cruise motors, which is the faster of the two flying machines, while the second design has four cruise motors and a slightly longer wing. Combining hover and cruise motors allows the aircraft greater manoeuvrability and speed for navigating urban environments.

UPS

As of May, 2020, UPS has made over paid 3,700 drone deliveries under Part 107 rules to WakeMed Hospital in Raleigh, North Carolina. In May 2020, UPS began taking prescriptions via Matternet M2 drone under part 107 rules about half a mile from a CVS to a central location in The Villages, Florida, from which a UPS employee makes the home delivery by golf cart.

In 2020, UPS also began drone deliveries between the central Wake Forest Baptist Medical Center campus in Winston-Salem and the health system's other locations. Another delivery service began for UC San Diego Health.

In June 2019, UPS Flight Forward obtained a Part 135 Air Carrier certificate from the FAA, allowing longer-distance and nighttime flights.

Manna 
Manna was the first company in Europe to receive a European-wide license to operate commercial drone deliveries. Their drone carries 3.5kg (~8lb) with ~30,000 cm3. With commercial partnerships with Tesco, Unilever, Coca-Cola, Samsung and local vendors of pharmacy, takeaway food, coffee, pastries, books and hardware store, Manna has completed over 100,000 delivery flights as of March 2022.

Swoop Aero 
Swoop Aero's network delivers health supplies to over 650,000 people in the Nsanje and Chikwawa districts in Southern Malawi.

The drones have a wingspan of 2.4m (nearly 8 feet) and are required to fly below 122m (about 400 feet) to ensure they don't collide with manned aircraft.

Illegal deliveries
Drug cartels have used UAVs to transport contraband, sometimes using GPS-guided UAVs.

From 2013 and 2015, UAVs were observed delivering items into prisons on at least four occasions in the United States while four separate but similar incidents occurred in Ireland, Britain, Australia and Canada as well. Though not a popular way of smuggling items into prisons, corrections officials state that some individuals are beginning to experiment with UAVs.

In November 2013, four people in Morgan, Georgia, were arrested for allegedly attempting to smuggle contraband into Calhoun State Prison with a hexacopter.

In June 2014, a quadcopter crashed into an exercise yard of Wheatfield Prison, Dublin. The quadcopter collided with wires designed to prevent helicopters landing to aid escapes, causing it to crash. A package containing drugs hung from the quadcopter and was seized by prisoners before prison staff could get to it.

Between 2014 and 2015, at two prisons in South Carolina, items such as drugs and cell phones were flown into the area by UAVs with authorities and one prison not knowing how many deliveries were successful before gaining the attention of authorities.

Technology

Aircraft configuration
A delivery drone's  is typically defined by the use-case of what is being delivered, and where it must be delivered to.

A common configuration is a multirotor - such as a quadcopter or octocopter - which is a drone with horizontally-aligned propellers. Another common configuration is a fixed-wing design. A multirotor design provides power to lift the drone and payload, redundancy to powertrain failure, and an ability to hover and descend vertically (VTOL). However, a multirotor configuration is less efficient and produces more noise. A fixed-wing configuration provides an order of magnitude increase in range, flight at higher airspeeds, and produces less noise, but requires more space for take-off, delivery, and landing.

There are also hybrid approaches (for example Wingcopter  or Swoop Aero)  that use multiple horizontal rotors for take-off and landing, and vertical rotors paired with a fixed-wing for forward flight.

Autopilot

There are many sensors in the drone which are necessary for it to fly autonomously. Inertial sensors such as an accelerometer help the drone remain in flight by providing data to allow the autopilot to adjust motor speeds (multirotor configuration) or control surface deflections (fixed-wing configuration) to steer the drone. Navigation sensors such as a GPS or magnetic sensors aid the drone to fly along a specific path or to a specific waypoint by measuring the drone's location and orientation with respect to the earth. Air flow sensors allow the drone to measure the air speed, temperature, and density, and that information maintain safe control of the aircraft. The drone may also use these sensors to estimate the wind speed and direction to assist with package delivery and/or landing manoeuvres.

Powertrain

Delivery drones need powerful motors to keep both the drone steady along with the load. Brushless DC motors are most typically used in drones because they have become cheap, lightweight, powerful, and small. The propeller blades of the drone turn at very high speeds, so the optimal material used for these rotor blades maximizes the strength to weight ratio. Some are made from carbon-fiber reinforced composites while others are made of thermoplastics because they are cheaper so the cost of replacement when the drone crashes is smaller. Lithium ion batteries are used in most drones because they offer enough energy and power, and they are relatively light so they do not weigh down the drone too much.

Ground control system

Delivery drones rely on ground control systems both for safe operations and for their commercial operations. For safe operations, the drone operator needs to manage their fleet of aircraft and how they integrate into the broader airspace. For commercial use cases, the ground systems allow for receiving and tracking orders.

See also
 Unmanned aerial vehicle
 Automated storage and retrieval system
 Delivery robot

References

Unmanned aerial vehicles
Emerging technologies
Freight transport
Flying robots